Hurricane Ivan was a large, long-lived, Cape Verde hurricane that caused widespread damage in the Caribbean and United States. The cyclone was the ninth named storm, the sixth hurricane and the fourth major hurricane of the active 2004 Atlantic hurricane season. 

Ivan formed in early September, and reached Category 5 strength on the Saffir–Simpson Hurricane Scale (SSHS). Ivan caused catastrophic damage in Grenada as a strong Category 3 storm, heavy damage in Jamaica as a strong Category 4 storm, and then severe damage in Grand Cayman, Cayman Islands, and the western tip of Cuba as a Category 5 hurricane. After peaking in strength, the hurricane moved north-northwest across the Gulf of Mexico to strike Pensacola/Milton, Florida and Alabama as a strong Category 3 storm, causing significant damage. Ivan dropped heavy rain on the Southeastern United States as it progressed northeastward and eastward through the Eastern United States, becoming an extratropical cyclone on September 18. The remnant low of the storm moved into the western subtropical Atlantic and regenerated into a tropical cyclone on September 22, which then moved across Florida and the Gulf of Mexico, and then into Louisiana and Texas, causing minimal damage. Ivan degenerated into a remnant low on September 24, before dissipating on the next day. 

Ivan caused an estimated US$26.1 billion (equivalent to $ billion in ) in damage along its path, of which $20.5 billion occurred in the United States.

Meteorological history

On September 2, 2004, Tropical Depression Nine formed from a large tropical wave southwest of Cape Verde. As the system moved to the west, it strengthened gradually, becoming Tropical Storm Ivan on September 3, and reaching hurricane strength on September 5,  to the east of Tobago. Later that day, the storm intensified rapidly, and by 5 p.m. The National Hurricane Center said that the rapid strengthening of Ivan on September 5 was unprecedented at such a low latitude in the Atlantic basin.

As it moved west, Ivan weakened slightly because of wind shear in the area. The storm passed over Grenada on September 7, battering several of the Windward Islands. As it entered the Caribbean Sea, Ivan reintensified rapidly and became a Category 5 hurricane, just north of the Windward Netherlands Antilles (Curaçao and Bonaire) and Aruba on September 9, with winds reaching . Ivan weakened slightly as it moved west-northwest towards Jamaica. As Ivan approached the island late on September 10, it began a westward jog that kept the eye and the strongest winds to the south and west. However, because of its proximity to the Jamaican coast, the island was battered with hurricane-force winds for hours.

After passing Cuba, Ivan resumed a more northerly track and regained Category 5 strength. Ivan passed through the Yucatán Channel late on September 13, while its eyewall affected the westernmost tip of Cuba. Once over the Gulf of Mexico, Ivan weakened slightly to Category 4 strength, which it maintained while approaching the Gulf Coast of the United States. When Ivan entered the Gulf of Mexico, U.S. Naval Research Laboratory ocean-floor pressure sensors detected a freak wave, which was caused by the hurricane. Their computer models also indicated that waves may have exceeded 130 feet (40 m) in the eyewall.

Just before it made landfall in the United States, Ivan's eyewall weakened considerably, and its southwestern portion almost disappeared. Around 2 a.m. Some hurricane information sources put the winds from Hurricane Ivan near  (Category 4) upon landfall in Alabama and northwestern Florida. Ivan then continued inland, maintaining hurricane strength until it was over central Alabama. Ivan weakened rapidly that evening and became a tropical depression on the same day, still over Alabama. Ivan lost tropical characteristics on September 18 while crossing Virginia, becoming an extratropical storm. Later that day, the remnant low of Ivan drifted off the U.S. mid-Atlantic coast into the Atlantic Ocean, and the low-pressure disturbance continued to dump rain on the United States.

On September 20, Ivan's remnant surface low completed an anticyclonic loop and moved across the Florida peninsula. As it continued westward across the northern Gulf of Mexico, the system reorganized and again took on tropical characteristics on September 22. On September 22, the National Weather Service, "after considerable and sometimes animated in-house discussion [regarding] the demise of Ivan," determined that the low was in fact a result of the remnants of Ivan and thus named it accordingly. On the evening of September 23, the revived Ivan made landfall near Cameron, Louisiana as a tropical depression. Ivan weakened into a remnant low on September 24, as it moved overland into Texas. The remnant circulation of Ivan persisted for another day, before dissipating on September 25.

Records

Ivan set 18 new records for intensity at low latitudes. When Ivan initially became a Category 1 hurricane on September 3, it was centered 9.5 degrees north from the equator. This is farthest south position on record for a hurricane in the Atlantic basin. Later that day (6 p.m. UTC), when Ivan became a Category 3 hurricane, it was centered near 10.2 degrees north from the equator. This is the most southerly location on record for a major hurricane in the Atlantic basin. Just six hours later, Ivan also became the most southerly Category 4 hurricane on record in the Atlantic basin when it reached that intensity while located at 10.6 degrees north. Finally, at midnight (UTC) on September 9 while centered at 13.7 degrees north, Ivan became the most southerly Category 5 hurricane on record in the Atlantic basin. The latter record would not be surpassed until Hurricane Matthew in 2016, which reached Category 5 intensity at 13.4 degrees north.

Ivan had held the world record of 33 (with 32 consecutive) six-hour periods of intensity at or above Category 4 strength. This record was broken two years later by Pacific Hurricane/Typhoon Ioke, which had 36 (33 consecutive) six-hour periods at Category 4 strength. This contributed to Ivan's total Accumulated Cyclone Energy (ACE) of 70.38. The tornado outbreak associated with Ivan spawned 127 tornadoes, more than any other tropical cyclone worldwide.

Scientists from the Naval Research Laboratory at Stennis Space Center, Mississippi have used a computer model to predict that, at the height of the storm, the maximum wave height within Ivan's eyewall reached .

Preparations

Caribbean
By September 5, a hurricane watch was posted for Barbados. Early on the following day, a tropical storm watch was issued for Grenada. Later that day, hurricane watches were also put into effect for Saint Lucia, and Martinique. A tropical storm warning was issued for Saint Vincent and Grenadines and Tobago and Grenada. By 3 p.m. UTC on September 6, the hurricane watches and tropical storm watches and warnings were upgraded to a hurricane warning and expanded to: Barbados, Saint Vincent and Grenadines, Saint Lucia, Tobago, and Grenada. Simultaneously, a tropical storm warning was issued for Trinidad. On September 7, the hurricane warning in effect for several countries was downgraded to a tropical storm warning. By September, all tropical storm and hurricane watches and warnings were discontinued in the eastern portions of the Windward Islands.

As Ivan continued westward, a hurricane watch was issued for the ABC islands on September 8. Many schools and businesses were closed in the Netherlands Antilles, and about 300 people evacuated their homes on Curaçao.

In the Caribbean, 500,000 Jamaicans were told to evacuate from coastal areas, but only 5,000 were reported to have moved to shelters.  12,000 residents and tourists were evacuated from Isla Mujeres off the Yucatán Peninsula.

United States
In Louisiana, mandatory evacuations of vulnerable areas in Jefferson, Lafourche, Plaquemines, St. Charles, St. James, St. John the Baptist, and Tangipahoa parishes took place, with voluntary evacuations ordered in six other parishes. More than one-third of the population of Greater New Orleans evacuated voluntarily, including more than half of the residents of New Orleans itself. At the height of the evacuation, intense traffic congestion on local highways caused delays of up to 12 hours. About a thousand special-needs patients were housed at the Louisiana Superdome during the storm. Ivan was considered a particular threat to the New Orleans area because dangers of catastrophic flooding. However, Plaquemines and St. Bernard Parishes suffered a moderate amount of wind damage. Hurricane preparedness for New Orleans was judged poor.  At one point, the media sparked fears of an "Atlantean" catastrophe if the hurricane were to make a direct strike on the city. These fears were not realized, as the storm's path turned further east.

In Mississippi, evacuation of mobile homes and vulnerable areas took place in Hancock, Jackson, and Harrison counties. In Alabama, evacuation in the areas of Mobile and Baldwin counties south of Interstate 10 was ordered, including a third of the incorporated territory of the City of Mobile, as well as several of its suburbs. In Florida, a full evacuation of the Florida Keys began at 7 a.m. EDT September 10 but was lifted at 5 a.m. EDT September 13 as Ivan tracked further west than originally predicted. Voluntary evacuations were declared in ten counties along the Florida Panhandle, with strong emphasis in the immediate western counties of Escambia, Santa Rosa, and Okaloosa. Ivan prompted the evacuation of 270 animals at the Alabama Gulf Coast Zoo in Gulf Shores, Alabama. The evacuation had to be completed within a couple of hours, with only 28 volunteers available to move the animals.

Impact

Ivan killed 64 people in the Caribbean—mainly in Grenada and Jamaica—three in Venezuela, and 25 in the United States, including fourteen in Florida. Thirty-two more deaths in the United States were indirectly attributed to Ivan. While traversing the eastern United States, Ivan spawned 120 tornadoes, striking communities along concentric arcs on the leading edge of the storm. In Florida, Blountstown, Marianna, and Panama City Beach suffered three of the most devastating tornadoes. A Panama City Beach news station was nearly hit by an F2 tornado during the storm. Ivan also caused over $20.5 billion (equivalent to $ billion in ) in damages in the United States and $3 billion (equivalent to $ billion in ) in the Caribbean.

Southeastern Caribbean and Venezuela

Ivan was a large-sized and major hurricane upon moving through the Windward Islands, battering structures, uprooting trees and causing power outages across much of the island chain. Even though it passed well south of Barbados on September 6, potent winds damaged 531 homes to varying degree, while one person drowned due to flooding. Monetary losses on the island surmounted $5 million. The worst of Ivan occurred in Grenada, when it passed directly over the island on September 7 with winds of over 135 mph (215 km/h). The island, in the words of a Caribbean disaster official, suffered "total devastation." At least 89% of the small island—or 28,000 of 31,000 homes—experienced damage. The capital, St. George's, was severely damaged and several notable buildings were destroyed, including two largest hospitals in Grenada. In all, 41 people lost their lives during the hurricane, damage on the island totalled $830.7 million (equivalent to $ in ), primarily to housing.

Lighter effects occurred in Trinidad and Tobago, with most of the damage confined to the smaller island of Tobago. Twenty villages on that island suffered various forms of damage, and at least 45 homes lost their roofs. One person died from a fallen tree, and damage was estimated at $4.9 million. Further north, large waves and high storm surge battered the coastlines of Saint Vincent and the Grenadines, washing away 2 homes, destroying 19 and damaging 40. Significant damage was reported to local banana crop, and losses for the country totaled $40 million. Strong winds and rough surf affected southern portions of Saint Lucia, inflicting $2.6 million worth in damage to homes and crops. High waves from Ivan caused light damage to southwestern Martinique and Guadeloupe, and gale-force winds buffeted Dominica.

As Ivan continued to strengthen, it proceeded about 80 mi (130 km) north of the ABC Islands on September 9. High winds blew away roof shingles and produced large swells that battered several coastal facilities. A developing spiral band dropped heavy rainfall over Aruba, causing flooding and $1.1 million worth in structural damage.

Jamaica

On September 11–12, the center of Ivan passed near Jamaica, causing significant wind and flood damage. Overall, 17 people were killed in Jamaica and 18,000 people were left homeless as a result of the flood waters and high winds. Most of the major resorts and hotels fared well, though, and were reopened only a few days after Ivan had passed.  Damage on Jamaica totaled $360 million (equivalent to $ in ).

Cayman Islands

In the Cayman Islands, Governor Bruce Dinwiddy described damage as "very, very severe and widespread." Despite strict building codes which made the islands' buildings well able to withstand even major hurricanes, Ivan's winds and storm surge were so strong that a quarter or more of the buildings on the islands were reported to be uninhabitable, with 85% damaged to some extent. Much of Grand Cayman still remained without power, water, or sewer services for several months later. After five months, barely half the pre-Ivan hotel rooms were usable. Two people were killed on Grand Cayman, one from drowning and the other from flying debris. Damage across the territory was catastrophic, with losses amounting to $2.86 billion (equivalent to $ in ) or 183 percent of its gross domestic product. The Letter from the Cayman Islands Government Office in the United Kingdom, 8 October 2004 by McKeeva Bush, Leader of Government Business details the intensity, extent of damage, and recovery process during the months that followed.

Elsewhere in the Caribbean
There were four deaths in the Dominican Republic. The region's Caribbean Development Bank estimates Ivan caused over $3 billion ($ in ) damage on island nations, mostly in the Cayman Islands, Grenada, and Jamaica.  Minor damage, including some beach erosion, was reported in the ABC islands.

Even though Ivan did not make landfall on Cuban soil, its storm surge caused localized flooding on Santiago de Cuba and Granma, on the southern part of the island. While there were no casualties on the island, the Cuban government estimates that about $1.2 billion ($ in  USD) of property damage were directly due to Ivan.

United States

Along with the 14 deaths in Florida, Ivan is blamed for eight deaths in North Carolina, two in Georgia, and one in Mississippi. An additional 32 deaths were reported as indirectly caused by the storm.

Waves estimated to be  caused tremendous pressures below the surface, causing a landslide that obliterated the platform. Hundreds of gallons of oil per day were still leaking onto the surface of the Gulf fourteen years later. The United States Coast Guard reported that the spill had been contained in 2019.

Ivan caused an estimated $20.5 billion (equivalent to $ in ) in damage in the United States alone, making it the second-costliest hurricane on record at the time, behind only Hurricane Andrew of 1992.

Florida

The area just west of Pensacola, including the community of Warrington (which includes Pensacola NAS), Perdido Key, and Innerarity Point, took the brunt of the storm. Some of the subdivisions in this part of the county were completely destroyed, with a few key roads in the Perdido area only opened in late 2005, over a year after the storm hit. Shattered windows from gusts and flying projectiles experienced throughout the night of the storm were common. As of December 2007, roads remained closed on Pensacola Beach because of damage from Ivan's storm surge.

In Pensacola, the Interstate 10 Escambia Bay Bridge was heavily damaged, with as much as a quarter-mile (400 m) of the bridge collapsing into the bay. The causeway that carries U.S. Highway 90 across the northern part of the same bay was also heavily damaged. The U.S. 90 causeway reopened first; the I-10 bridge reopened, with temporary repairs, in November. Virtually all of Perdido Key, an area on the outskirts of Pensacola that bore the brunt of Ivan's winds and rain, was essentially leveled. High surf and wind brought extensive damage to Innerarity Point.

On September 26, 2006, over two years after Ivan struck the region, funding for the last 501 FEMA-provided trailers ran out for those living in Santa Rosa and Escambia counties.

Alabama

Alabama experienced the highest wind gust during Ivan.

The heaviest damage as Ivan made landfall on the U.S. coastline was observed in Baldwin County in Alabama, where the storm's eye (and eyewall) made landfall. High surf and wind brought extensive damage to Orange Beach near the border with Florida. Both were made of steel-reinforced concrete. Debris gathered in piles along the storm tide, exacerbating the damage when the floodwaters crashed into homes sitting on pilings.

In addition to the damage to the southern portions of the state, there was extensive damage to the state's electrical grid. At the height of the outages, Alabama Power reported 489,000 subscribers had lost electrical power—roughly half of its subscriber base.

Hurricane Ivan caused $18.82 billion in Alabama, which is the costliest ever recorded in the state. However, despite 56 people dying in the United States, none of them were in Alabama. It was the last storm to make landfall in Alabama until Hurricane Sally. Hurricane Ivan was also the strongest hurricane to hit Alabama since Hurricane Frederic in 1979, which was a category 4. 
.

Elsewhere in the United States

Further inland, Ivan caused major flooding, bringing the Chattahoochee River near Atlanta and many other rivers and streams to levels at or near 100-year records. The Delaware River and its tributaries crested just below their all-time records set by Hurricane Diane in 1955. Locations in southern New Hampshire and Massachusetts received over 7 inches of rainfall from the remnants of Ivan, causing flooding and mudslides.  In Connecticut, high winds moved in quickly and unexpectedly, and a boater was killed when his trimaran capsized in 50-knot winds on Long Island Sound.

In western North Carolina, many streams and rivers reached well above flood stage in an area that was heavily flood damaged just a week and a half prior from the remnants of Hurricane Frances, causing many roads to be closed. High winds contributed to widespread power outages throughout the mountainous region. The Blue Ridge Parkway as well as Interstate 40 through the Pigeon River gorge in Haywood County, North Carolina sustained major damage, and landslides were common across the mountains. There was major flooding along the French Broad River and Swannanoa River in Asheville, North Carolina and along the Pigeon River near Canton, North Carolina. As a result of the rain, a major debris flow of mud, rocks, trees, and water surged down Peek's Creek, near Franklin, North Carolina, sweeping away 15 houses and killing five people.

The system also spawned deadly tornadoes as far north as Maryland and destroyed seven oil platforms in the Gulf of Mexico while at sea. While crossing over the Mid-Atlantic states, Ivan's remnants spawned 117 tornadoes across the eastern United States, with the 40 tornadoes spawned in Virginia on September 17 setting a daily record for the commonwealth. Ivan then moved into the Wheeling, West Virginia and Pittsburgh area, causing major flooding and gusty winds. Pittsburgh International Airport recorded the highest 24-hour rainfall for Pittsburgh, recording  of rain. Ivan's rain caused widespread flooding. The Juniata River basin was flooded, and the Frankstown Branch crested at its highest level ever.

Canada
On the morning of September 21, the remnant mid-level circulation of Ivan combined with a frontal system. This produced a plume of moisture over the Canadian Maritimes for four days, producing heavy rainfall totaling  in Gander, Newfoundland. High winds of up to  downed trees and caused power outages in Newfoundland, Prince Edward Island, and eastern Nova Scotia. The system produced intense waves of up to  near Cape Bonavista. The system killed two when it grounded a fishing vessel and was indirectly responsible for four traffic fatalities in Newfoundland.

Aftermath

Grenada

Grenada suffered serious economic repercussions following the destruction caused by Ivan. Before Ivan, the economy of Grenada was projected to grow by 4.7%, but the island's economy instead contracted by nearly 3% in 2004. The economy was also projected to grow by at least 5% through 2007, but, that estimate had been lowered to less than 1%. The government of Grenada also admitted that government debt, 130% of the island's GDP, was "unsustainable" in October 2004 and appointed a group of professional debt advisors in January 2005 to help seek a cooperative restructuring agreement with creditors.

More than $150 million was sent to Grenada in 2004 to aid reconstruction following Ivan, but the economic situation remains fragile. The International Monetary Fund reports that as "difficult enough as the present fiscal situation is, it is unfortunately quite easy to envisage circumstances that would make it even more so." Furthermore, "shortfalls in donor financing and tax revenues, or events such as a further rise in global oil prices, pose a grave risk."

Jamaica
By two days after Ivan's passage, USAID's hurricane recovery program distributed emergency relief supplies for families who were displaced by the storm. During phase one of the recovery program, communities restored three tourist sites, cleared agricultural lands, and completed disaster mitigation. In addition, the U.S. Peace Corps completed thirty small projects in rural communities and low income neighborhoods. 66 health clinics, 25 schools, and 62 water and sanitation systems were repaired during the first phase of recovery. About 1,379 farmers, herders and micro businesses became eligible for grants. By 2005, 55 schools and colleges were repaired, while restoration of 1,560 houses had occurred.

United States
On September 27, 2004, President of the United States George W. Bush submitted a budget to the United States Congress which requested over $7 billion (2004 USD) in aid to victims of Hurricane Ivan and Jeanne in the following states: Alabama, Florida, Georgia, Louisiana, Mississippi, North Carolina, Ohio, Pennsylvania, and West Virginia. Over half of the $7 billion (2004 USD) was to cover uninsured damage to property and public infrastructure. $889 million was spent to repair Department of Defense facilities. About $600 million was earmarked for emergency repairs to highways and road damaged by Hurricanes Charley, Frances, Ivan, and Jeanne. The Small Business Administration (SBA) used $472 million to provide loans for small businesses and homeowners affected by the storm. Approximately $400 million was given by the United States Department of Agriculture to provide financial assistance agricultural producers suffering crop and other losses. Around $132 million was used to repair Federal facilities by several government agencies, including: United States Coast Guard, Federal Bureau of Prisons, the United States Forest Service, and the Federal Aviation Administration. The United States Army Corps of Engineers used $81 million for restoration of coastal areas affected by Ivan. In addition, $50 million of which was for disaster and famine assistance funds Grenada, Jamaica, and Haiti.

Following the storm in Alabama, more than 167,700 people applied for assistance in 65 counties in the state. over 51 counties in the state became eligible for public assistance. As a result, the U.S. Department of Homeland Security's Federal Emergency Management Agency (FEMA) and the Alabama Emergency Management Agency (AEMA) received $735 million, which was spent in disaster assistance, and included: low-interest loans for homeowners and businesses, disaster food stamps, Disaster Unemployment Assistance to those left unemployed as a result of Ivan, "Project Rebound", and to fill the 5,856 National Flood Insurance Program claims. In addition, there were repairs to public infrastructure such as roads, bridges, buildings, utilities, facilities, and parks. 20 Disaster Recovery Centers were opened in 13 counties, which also included the Poarch Creek Indian Reservation. Overall, FEMA paid 90% of the $735 million, while the AEMA paid for the other 10%.

Ivan is suspected of bringing spores of soybean rust from Venezuela into the United States, the first ever occurrences of soybean rust found in North America. Since the Florida soybean crop had already been mostly harvested, economic damage was limited. Some of the most severe outbreaks in South America have been known to reduce soybean crop yields by half or more. Following the storm, more than 138,500 residents in 15 counties of the Florida Panhandle applied for federal and state aid. In those counties, a total of $162.6 million was approved by FEMA's Individuals and Households Program. In addition, residents of 24 other counties in Florida were eligible for grants and loans. By September 2005, more than $1.4 billion in federal and state assistance was approved for residents and communities in the Florida Panhandle. In addition, the National Flood Insurance Program paid nearly $869 million for more than 9,800 insurance claims after Ivan.

More than $4 million in disaster assistance was approved for Mississippi by FEMA and the Mississippi Emergency Management Agency (MEMA). In addition, the SBA issued nearly 3,000 applications for low-interest loans to homeowners, renters, landlords, businesses, and non-profit organizations. The loans covered up to $200,000 in real estate repairs/replacements and up to $40,000 in repairs/replacements of personal property.

Residents and business owners in eight parishes of Louisiana became eligible for disaster assistance. By one week before the deadline to apply on November 15, 2004, about 9,527 residents applied for disaster assistance. Overall, FEMA and the Government of Louisiana provided more than $3.8 million to those that requested assistance. In addition, the SBA also allowed applications for loans to repair personal property until that day.

Retirement

This storm marked the third occasion the name "Ivan" had been used to name a tropical cyclone in the Atlantic, as well as the fifth of six occurrences worldwide. Because of the severe damage and number of deaths in the Caribbean and United States, the name Ivan was retired in the spring of 2005 by the World Meteorological Organization and will never again be used in the Atlantic basin. It was replaced by Igor for the 2010 season.

Hydrological records

See also

 List of Category 5 Atlantic hurricanes
 List of Cuba hurricanes
 List of Florida hurricanes (2000–present)
 List of North Carolina hurricanes (2000–present)
 List of retired Atlantic hurricane names
 List of wettest tropical cyclones in the United States
 Hurricane Sally (2020) – A Category 2 hurricane that made landfall on Gulf Shores, Alabama on the same day as Hurricane Ivan 16 years later.
 Taylor Energy oil spill

Notes

References

External links

 
 NHC advisory archives for Hurricane Ivan
 HPC Rainfall Page for Ivan
 Thanks for the Pageviews, Ivan
 Ivan May Just Be a Messenger
 "Waves Hit Navarre Pier Hard During Hurricane Ivan's Approach" as found in the State Library and Archives of Florida
 Hurricane Ivan (YouTube)

 
Ivan 2004
Ivan 2004
Ivan 2004
Ivan 2004
Hurricanes in the Windward Islands
Hurricanes in Cuba
Hurricanes in Barbados
Hurricanes in Grenada
Hurricanes in Trinidad and Tobago
Hurricanes in Saint Lucia
Hurricanes in Saint Vincent and the Grenadines
Hurricanes in Jamaica
Hurricanes in the Cayman Islands
Hurricanes in Alabama
Hurricanes in Florida
2004 in the Caribbean
2004 natural disasters
Hurricane Ivan
Hurricane Ivan
Hurricanes in Tennessee
Hurricanes in West Virginia
Rogue wave incidents
F3 tornadoes
Hurricanes in the ABC Islands
September 2004 events in North America
Ivan